The following lists events that happened during 1939 in South Africa.

Incumbents
 Monarch: King George VI.
 Governor-General and High Commissioner for Southern Africa: Sir Patrick Duncan (starting 5 April).
 Prime Minister: James Barry Munnik Hertzog (until 5 September), Jan Christiaan Smuts (starting 5 September).
 Chief Justice: James Stratford.

Events

September
 2 – J. B. M. Hertzog puts his case to the National Assembly for South Africa to remain neutral in the Second World War, against Jan Smuts who supports a Commonwealth alliance.
 4 – Jan Smuts becomes the 4th Prime Minister of South Africa for the second time.
 5 – The National Assembly votes on a motion whether or not to join the war and Jan Smuts wins by 13 votes.
 6 – The Union of South Africa declares war on Germany.

Unknown date
 The University of Pretoria's official university newspaper, Die Perdeby, is established.

Births
 6 March – Lina Spies, Afrikaans poet and academic.
 18 March – John W. de Gruchy, academic.
 25 March – Pius Langa, Chief Justice of the Constitutional Court of South Africa.
 4 April – Hugh Masekela, jazz musician. (d. 2018)
 21 June – Essop Pahad, politician.
 7 July – Gilbert Ramano, military commander.
 19 September; Caiphus Semenya, composer and musician.
 14 September – Mary Twala, actress, mother of TV personality, Somizi Mhlongo (d. 2020)
 27 September – Lydia Mokgokoloshi, actress
 16 September – Breyten Breytenbach, writer and painter.
 26 October – Karel Schoeman, South African novelist (d. 2017)
 25 November – Janette Deacon, archaeologist specialising in rock art conservation

Deaths
 16 October – Charlotte Maxeke, religious leader and political activist. (b. 1871)

Railways

Locomotives
The first two diesel-electric locomotive types enter service on the South African Railways (SAR):
 A single Class DS AEG shunting engine enters service at the Congella yards near Durban.
 A second shunting locomotive, the Class DS1, enters SAR service while another is delivered to the Electricity Supply Commission.
 The Hollandse Anneming Maatschappij, constructors of a new Table Bay harbour, imports a small  locomotive as on-site construction engine, later employed as SAR dock shunter.

Sports
 3 March – In Durban, the Timeless Test begins between England and South Africa, the longest game of cricket ever played. It is abandoned twelve days later when the English team has to catch the ship for home.

References

History of South Africa